Vladimir Kadlec (born 9 July 1957) is a former German basketball player. He competed in the men's tournament at the 1984 Summer Olympics.

References

1957 births
Living people
German men's basketball players
Olympic basketball players of West Germany
Basketball players at the 1984 Summer Olympics
BSC Saturn Köln players
Sportspeople from Prague
Czechoslovak emigrants to Germany